South Moline Township is located in Rock Island County, Illinois. As of the 2010 census, its population was 36,399 and it contained 17,140 housing units. South Moline Township formed from Moline Township in March, 1879.

Geography

Demographics

References

External links
City-data.com
Illinois State Archives

Townships in Rock Island County, Illinois
Townships in Illinois